Osage County Courthouse may refer to:

Osage County Courthouse (Kansas), Lyndon, Kansas
Osage County Courthouse (Oklahoma), Pawhuska, Oklahoma, listed on the National Register of Historic Places